Pygarctia matudai is a species of moth in the family Erebidae. It was described by Carlos Rommel Beutelspacher in 1978. It is found in Mexico.

References

Arctiidae genus list at Butterflies and Moths of the World of the Natural History Museum

Moths described in 1978
Phaegopterina